Denis Tristant (born 23 November 1964) is a French handball player who competed in the 1992 Summer Olympics.

He was born in Pacy-sur-Eure.

In 1992 he was a member of the French handball team which won the bronze medal. He played three matches and scored one goal.

External links
profile

1964 births
Living people
French male handball players
Olympic handball players of France
Handball players at the 1992 Summer Olympics
Olympic bronze medalists for France
Olympic medalists in handball
Medalists at the 1992 Summer Olympics